Hassan Moustafa (born 28 July 1944) is an Egyptian sports administrator and former handball player. Moustafa is the fifth and current president of International Handball Federation, and a former president of Egyptian Handball Federation.

Early life and education
Moustafa was born in Cairo in 1944. Moustafa studied in German College of Physical Education and Sports in Leipzig, Germany and completed a doctoral thesis on the topic: The administration elements of a successful mission of clubs and federation.

Handball career
Moustafa devoted his life to handball. He played for the Al-Ahly Club for fifteen years and played for the Egyptian national team for ten years. After the end of his playing career, he was involved in coaching and elected as best coach in Egypt in 1998. He was also an international handball referee.

Sports administration
Besides being elected as the President of International Handball Federation in the year 2000, Moustafa was the President of Egyptian Handball Federation from 1984 to 1992 and from 1996 to 2008. He was also elected as the Secretary General of Egyptian Olympic Committee. He was elected as the Chairman of IHF Commission of Coaching and Methods of International Handball Federation from 1992 to 2000.

IHF Presidency
Moustafa has been President of the International Handball Federation since 2000. During the 2009 World Men's Handball Championship a conflict emerged between Moustafa and the Secretary General of the IHF, Peter Mühlematter.
Following table shows the results of election of the President of International Handball Federation.

References

1944 births
Living people
Egyptian male handball players
Egyptian sports coaches
Handball coaches
Presidents of international sport federations
20th-century Egyptian people